ARM California may refer to one of the following ships of the Mexican Navy named for the Gulf of California:

 , the former  USS Hutchinson (PF-45), launched August 1943; acquired by the Mexican Navy, 1947; scrapped, June 1964
 , the former  USS Belet (APD-109), launched March 1944; acquired by the Mexican Navy, December 1963; reassigned pennant number of B03 prior to April 1970; wrecked in Baja California, January 1972

See also
 , Oaxaca-class patrol ship

Mexican Navy ship names